Ark Hill is a mountainous landform within the Sidlaw Hills in Angus, Scotland.  This location has been proposed as a windfarm for generating renewable electrical power.   Approximately two kilometres to the north is the village of Eassie noted for the presence of the Eassie Stone; this carved Pictish stone is dated prior to the Early Middle Ages.

See also
Eassie Stone
Glamis Castle
Wester Denoon

References

Mountains and hills of Angus, Scotland